Unholy is a 2005 album by British musician Martin Grech.

Track listing
"Guiltless" – 7:42
"Venus" – 5:47
"Erosion And Regeneration" – 5:07
"I Am Chromosome" – 5:00
"An End" – 3:09
"Holy Father Inferior" – 9:25
"Worldly Divine" – 4:54
"Lint" – 3:29
"Elixir" – 15:35*

The duration of "Elixir" is 6:14 - there is then a 5-minute silence before the bonus track - "Sun"

References

2005 albums
Martin Grech albums